Troy Garton (born 20 February 1988) is a New Zealand amateur boxer. She won a bronze medal in the women's 60 kg division at the 2018 Commonwealth Games on the Gold Coast.

Awards and recognitions
2019 Gladrap Boxing Awards Amateur Boxer of the Year (Nominated)
2020 New Zealand Fighter Boxing Awards Amateur female boxer of the year (Won)

References

External links
 
 

1988 births
Living people
Lightweight boxers
New Zealand women boxers
Commonwealth Games competitors for New Zealand
Commonwealth Games bronze medallists for New Zealand
Commonwealth Games medallists in boxing
Boxers at the 2018 Commonwealth Games
Boxers at the 2022 Commonwealth Games
Medallists at the 2018 Commonwealth Games